Dysschema cerialis is a moth of the family Erebidae first described by Herbert Druce in 1884. It is found in Panama.

References

Moths described in 1884
Dysschema